Bonnie M. Watson Coleman (born February 6, 1945) is an American politician. She has served as the U.S. representative for New Jersey's 12th congressional district since 2015. She is a member of the Democratic Party. Watson Coleman served in the New Jersey General Assembly, from 1998 to 2015 for the 15th legislative district. She is the first African-American woman to represent New Jersey in Congress.

Early life and education
Watson Coleman was born in Camden, New Jersey. Her father, John S. Watson, served six terms in the New Jersey legislature. She graduated from Ewing High School. She received a B.A. from Thomas Edison State College in 1985 after briefly attending Rutgers University-Camden. She is a member of Alpha Kappa Alpha sorority. Raised Baptist, she resides in Ewing Township.

Early career 
In 1974, Watson Coleman established the first Office of Civil Rights, Contract Compliance and Affirmative Action, in the New Jersey Department of Transportation and remained the director of that office for six years. In 1980, she joined the Department of Community Affairs, where she held a number of positions including assistant commissioner responsible for aging, community resources, public guardian and women divisions.

Watson Coleman served on the Governing Boards Association of State Colleges from 1987 to 1998 and as its chair from 1991 to 1993. She was a member of the Ewing Township Planning Board from 1996 to 1997, a member of The Richard Stockton College of New Jersey board of trustees from 1981 to 1998, and its chair from 1990 to 1991.

Watson Coleman served in the New Jersey General Assembly from 1998 to 2015 for the 15th Legislative District, the same district her father represented. She became the first African American woman to lead the state party when she was elected chair of the New Jersey Democratic State Committee on February 4, 2002. She served until 2006. Watson Coleman served as Majority Leader of the New Jersey General Assembly from 2006 to 2010.

U.S. House of Representatives

2014 election
Following the announcement that Congressman Rush Holt would not seek another term in office, Watson Coleman announced her candidacy for the seat in New Jersey's 12th congressional district.

On June 3, Watson Coleman won the Democratic primary. She defeated Republican nominee Alieta Eck in the November 4 general election with 60.9% of the vote. She resigned her state legislature seat to enter Congress. Watson Coleman's win made her the first African-American woman elected to represent a New Jersey district in the U.S. House of Representatives.

Tenure
On March 3, 2015, Watson Coleman participated with fellow Democrats in the boycott of Israeli Prime Minister Benjamin Netanyahu's speech to Congress.

In March 2016, Watson Coleman and Representatives Robin Kelly and Yvette D. Clarke founded the Congressional Caucus on Black Women and Girls. "Black women and girls are disproportionately affected by myriad socioeconomic issues that diminish their quality of life and threaten the well-being of their families and communities. The Congressional Caucus on Black Women and Girls gives black women a seat at the table for the crucial discussion on the policies that impact them while also providing a framework for creating opportunities and eliminating barriers to success for black women", they announced in a press release. They were inspired by the #SheWoke Committee, a group of seven activists that reached out to lawmakers and staffers to start.

Watson Coleman co-sponsored the International Megan's Law, to combat child exploitation and other sex crimes abroad. President Barack Obama signed the bill into law in February 2016.

In July 2019, Watson Coleman voted against H. Res. 246 - 116th Congress, a House resolution introduced by Representative Brad Schneider opposing efforts to boycott the State of Israel and the Global Boycott, Divestment, and Sanctions Movement targeting Israel. The resolution passed 398–17.

Committee assignments
 Committee on Homeland Security
 Subcommittee on Emergency Preparedness, Response, and Communications
 Subcommittee on Oversight and Management Efficiency (Ranking Member)
 Subcommittee on Transportation and Public Assets
 Committee on Appropriations
 United States House Appropriations Subcommittee on Labor, Health and Human Services, Education, and Related Agencies

Caucus memberships
Congressional Progressive Caucus 
Congressional Black Caucus 
Congressional Arts Caucus  
Congressional Asian Pacific American Caucus
Medicare for All Caucus
Blue Collar Caucus

Political positions 

Watson Coleman has been a strong supporter of programs allowing criminal offenders to reenter society. Her two sons were sentenced to seven years in prison after committing armed robbery against a Kids R Us store in 2001. One of her sons gained employment with a county agency after his release. Watson Coleman also supports a ban of the type of assault rifles her sons used in the robbery. As a New Jersey Assemblywoman, she sponsored a bill that bars companies with more than 15 employees from conducting criminal background checks on candidates during the interview process.

In October 2020, Watson Coleman co-signed a letter to Secretary of State Mike Pompeo that condemned Azerbaijan’s offensive operations against the Armenian-populated enclave of Nagorno-Karabakh, denounced Turkey’s role in the Nagorno-Karabakh conflict, and called for an immediate ceasefire.

Personal life 
In 1972, Watson Coleman married Jim Carter. They had a son. They divorced in the early 1980s. In 1995, she married William Coleman. He has two sons from a previous marriage.

Watson Coleman's two sons, William Carter-Watson and Jared C. Coleman, pleaded guilty to holding up the Kids "R" Us store at Mercer Mall with a handgun as it was about to close on March 12, 2001; they were sentenced to seven years in prison and served  years. Watson Coleman has acknowledged it in the past and introduced legislation "that bars companies with more than 15 employees to conduct criminal background checks on candidates during the interview process". She argued for the law, saying, "One of the greatest barriers to a second chance in the state of New Jersey is a barrier to employment”; it was later passed and signed into law. In 2014, her son William Carter-Watson was hired by the Mercer County Parks Commission as an entry-level laborer. When asked for comment, Brian Hughes, the County Executive, said, "the county has maintained a policy of hiring ex-convicts in search of a second chance".

In the summer of 2018, Watson Coleman underwent surgery to remove a cancerous tumor.

Watson Coleman tested positive for COVID-19 on January 11, 2021. She believed she contracted the virus from Republican colleagues who refused to wear masks while they sheltered together during the 2021 storming of the Capitol.

Electoral history

See also
 List of African-American United States representatives
 Women in the United States House of Representatives

References

External links

 Congresswoman Bonnie Watson Coleman official U.S. House website
 Bonnie Watson Coleman for Congress
 

 
 

|-

|-

|-

|-

1945 births
21st-century American politicians
21st-century American women politicians
African-American members of the United States House of Representatives
African-American state legislators in New Jersey
African-American women in politics
Chairmen of the New Jersey Democratic State Committee
Democratic Party members of the United States House of Representatives from New Jersey
Ewing High School (New Jersey) alumni
Female members of the United States House of Representatives
Living people
Democratic Party members of the New Jersey General Assembly
People from Ewing Township, New Jersey
Politicians from Camden, New Jersey
Stockton University
Thomas Edison State University alumni
Women state legislators in New Jersey
20th-century American politicians
20th-century American women politicians
21st-century African-American women
20th-century African-American people
20th-century African-American women